Ho Chi Minh City University of Fine Arts (Vietnamese: Đại học Mỹ thuật Thành phố Hồ Chí Minh) is a university in Bình Thạnh District, Ho Chi Minh City, Vietnam. The predecessor of this school was the École des Dessins, founded by André Joyeux in 1913, which became the École des Arts appliqués de Gia Đinh from 1940 to 1971 (Trung học Trang trí Mỹ thuật Gia Định).

Under the administration of the Republic of Vietnam, from 1971, the school was upgraded to become Saigon College of Fine Arts. The Fine Arts College was founded in 1976. In 1981, the Vietnamese prime minister decided to found the university as it is today.

Alumni
 Nguyẽ̂n Lam (born 1941)
 Đỗ Quang Em (1942–2021)
 Lê Hiền Minh (born 1979)

References

External links
 

Universities in Ho Chi Minh City